is a Japanese architect based in Tokyo. He is a graduate of Yokohama National University, and is director of his own firm, Office of Ryue Nishizawa, established in 1997. In 1995, he co-founded the firm SANAA (Sejima and Nishizawa and Associates) with the architect Kazuyo Sejima. In 2010, he became the youngest recipient ever of the Pritzker Prize, together with Sejima.

Projects
 Weekend House - 1997 to 1998 - Gunma, Japan
 Takeo Head Office Store - 1999 to 2000 - Tokyo, Japan
 House at Kamakura - 1999 to 2001 - Kanagawa, Japan
 Apartment Building at Ichikawa - 2001 to Present - Chiba, Japan
 Eda Apartment Building - 2002 to Present - Kanagawa, Japan
 Funabashi Apartment Building - 2002 to 2004 - Chiba, Japan
 Moriyama House - 2002 to 2005 - Tokyo, Japan
 Love Planet Museum - 2003 - Okayama, Japan
 Video Pavilion - 2003 to Present - Kagawa, Japan
 House in China - 2003 to Present - Tianjin, China
 Office Building, Benesse Art Site Naoshima - 2004 - Kagawa, Japan
 21st Century Museum of Contemporary Art - 2004 - Kanazawa, Japan
 A House - 2004 to 2007 - Tokyo, Japan
 Honmura Lounge & Archive - 2005 to Present - Kagawa, Japan
 The New Museum - New York, United States
 Towada Art Center - 2008 - Aomori, Japan
 Teshima Art Museum - 2010 - Kagawa, Japan
Hiroshi Senju Museum - 2011 - Karuizawa, Japan
Garden and House - 2013 - Tokyo, Japan

Exhibitions 

 Some Ideas on Living in London and Tokyo by Stephen Taylor and Ryue Nishizawa, Canadian Centre for Architecture, Montreal (2008)
Kazuyo Sejima + Ryue Nishizawa / SANAA, Henry Art Gallery, Seattle (2008)
Kazuyo Sejima + Ryue Nishizawa SANAA, Towada Art Center, Towada Aomori (2014)
Conceptions of Space: Recent Acquisitions in Contemporary Architecture, MoMA, New York (2014)
Japan Architects 1945-2010, 21st Century Museum of Contemporary Art, Kanazawa (2014-2015)
A Japanese Constellation: Toyo Ito, SANAA, and Beyond, MoMA, New York (2016)

Notes

Further reading 

 Gallery MA (2003). Kazuyo Sejima + Ryue Nishizawa / SANAA Works 1995–2003. Toto Shuppan. 

 GA (2005). Sejima Kazuyo + Nishizawa Ryue Dokuhon. A.D.A. Edita. 
 GA (2005). GA ARCHITECT 18 Sejima Kazuyo + Nishizawa Ryue. A.D.A. Edita. 
 Yuko Hasegawa (2006). Kazuyo Sejima + Ryue Nishizawa: SANAA. Phaidon Press. 
 Agustin Perez Rubio (2007). SANAA Houses: Kazuyo Sejima + Ryue Nishizawa. Actar. 
Joseph Grima and Karen Wong (Eds) (2008) Shift: SANAA and the New Museum. Lars Müller Publishers. 
Thomas Daniell (2008). After the Crash: Architecture in Post-Bubble Japan. Princeton Architectural Press. 
Giovanna Borasi (Ed) 2008. Some ideas on living in London and Tokyo : Stephen Taylor, Ryue Nishizawa. Montreal: Canadian Centre for Architecture; Baden, Switzerland: Lars Müller.

External links

 Ryue Nishizawa lectures on Theory and Practice
 Office of Ryue Nishizawa official website 
 SANAA official website 
SANAA: Works 1998-2008 New Museum of Contemporary Art, New York Video at VernissageTV.
Finding aid to the Ryue Nishizawa records, Canadian Centre for Architecture.

20th-century Japanese architects
Pritzker Architecture Prize winners
Rolf Schock Prize laureates
People from Yokohama
1966 births
Living people
Yokohama National University alumni
21st-century Japanese architects